Port of Cebu is a seaport located in Cebu City, Philippines. It is the port that serves the Metro Cebu Area and it is managed by the Cebu Port Authority. It is the largest domestic port in the Philippines, mostly serving routes in the Visayas and Mindanao.

Location
It is located in the North Reclamation Area, Cebu City. It is in the Mactan Channel, a narrow strait between Cebu and Mactan Island.

Facilities

The harbor consists of international and domestic sections.

Passenger terminal

The  terminal started regular operations on November 21, 2014. It features a fully air–conditioned terminal with a spacious lobby that houses the Port Management Office, a send-off area, and a last-minute canteen. It also has a Wi-Fi Internet Connection.

Statistics
Statistics include all ports under jurisdiction by Cebu Port Authority, i.e. Cebu City, Mandaue, Danao, Santa Fe, Toledo, and Argao.

References

External links

Cebu Port
Buildings and structures in Cebu City
Transportation in Cebu